Front Porch Forum (FPF) is a social network founded in 2000 and based in Burlington, Vermont. It is a Vermont public benefit corporation. Users interact with the site either through a web page, mobile application, or via email. Posts to the site are aggregated and curated by staff, and distributed as email digests.

The site contains over 200 separate forums, each corresponding to a town, combination of towns, or district of a city as well as a few parts of New Hampshire, Massachusetts, and New York. As of 2020 the site had nearly 200,000 members and a staff of twenty. Fifty percent of FPF users post to the site in a given year. The site also maintains a community directory of local businesses.

Registered users are required to give their street address or official position, for participating public officials, in order to post to the site. The company makes its revenue through advertisements and featured community directory listings from local companies, subscriptions from politicians or local governmental officials, and a yearly fundraiser.

Front Porch Forum originated as a Burlington-centric local email list called the Five Sisters Neighborhood Forum. Michael and Valerie Wood-Lewis were new to the area, parenting a son with cerebral palsy, and wanted to meet more of their neighbors. They began by distributing flyers in their local area encouraging people to join and received a positive response. Michael Wood-Lewis hired engineer Rob Maurizi to design and relaunch list using its own homegrown software in 2006, with Wood-Lewis being the daily digest of posts.

Originally towns or regions would pay a small fee to have an FPF instance set up for their town. In 2011 an initiative from the Vermont Council on Rural Development (VCRD) received a federal grant to expand internet access to rural parts of the state, and they offered FPF as part of a package to towns that applied for assistance. After Hurricane Irene VCRD received a second grant to "increase the resiliency of at-risk towns" which allowed FPF to increase their coverage to the entire state of Vermont. The site is free for users.

References

External links
 Official website

Social networks
2000 establishments in Vermont
Community websites
Internet properties established in 2000
Virtual communities